Douglas Young (born 12 December 1961) is a British boxer. He competed in the men's heavyweight event at the 1984 Summer Olympics.

References

External links
 

1961 births
Living people
Scottish male boxers
British male boxers
Olympic boxers of Great Britain
Boxers at the 1984 Summer Olympics
Boxers at the 1986 Commonwealth Games
Commonwealth Games bronze medallists for Scotland
Commonwealth Games medallists in boxing
People from Jedburgh
Heavyweight boxers
Medallists at the 1986 Commonwealth Games